This article lists significant demonstrations by the anti-globalization movement against corporate globalization since 1999, including the convergence of anti-globalization actions with opposition to the United States-led Iraq War beginning in 2003 and continuing through the end of George W. Bush's presidency in 2009. The list also includes actions related to the Occupy movement against worldwide economic inequality, which began with Occupy Wall Street in 2011.

1999
June 18, 1999 – Carnival against Capitalism worldwide, including London, England / Eugene, US / Cologne, Germany, J18 or Global Action Day protests
November 30, 1999 – 100,000 protest in Seattle, against the World Trade Organization Third Ministerial conference, also known as the 'Battle of Seattle' or 'N30'.

2000
January 27, 2000 – Clashes in Davos, Switzerland, ahead of the World Economic Forum
April 16, 2000 – Washington A16, 2000, Washington, DC, International Monetary Fund (IMF) and World Bank
May 1, 2000 – Global May Day protests in London, Berlin, and other cities.
June 4, 2000 – Protests against the Organization of American States in Windsor, Ontario
June 13, 2000 – Protests during the week-long 16th World Petroleum Congress in Calgary, Alberta
July 29, 2000 – 'R2K' mass protests at the Republican National Convention in Philadelphia
August 11, 2000 – Clashes in Los Angeles, during the Democratic National Convention.
September 11, 2000 –  S11 protests against the World Economic Forum in Melbourne
September 26, 2000 – Protests in Prague, Czech Republic, against the World Bank/IMF
November 20, 2000 – Montreal, Quebec, G20 meeting
December 7, 2000 – Protests at EU Summit in Nice, France

2001
January 20, 2001 – Washington, DC, Mass protests against Bush's inauguration ceremony.
January 27, 2001 – Clashes in Davos, Switzerland, at World Economic Forum
March 17, 2001 – Clashes in Napoli, Italy, during the World Global Forum.
April 20, 2001 – 20,000 protest and clash with police at 'A20,' the 3rd Summit of the Americas (FTAA) in Quebec City, Canada
May 1, 2001 – Global May Day protests in London, Berlin, Sydney, and other cities.
June 15, 2001 – Riots in Gothenburg, Sweden at EU Summit; three protestors shot by police, 1130 arrests.
June 25, 2001 – Protests in Barcelona, Spain during World Bank summit.
July 1, 2001 – Salzburg, Austria World Economic Forum
July 20, 2001 – 250,000 protest in Genoa, Italy against the G8 summit. A protester Carlo Giuliani, was shot dead by police.
September 29, 2001 – Washington, DC, Anti-capitalist anti-war protests

2002
February 1, 2002 – New York City, US / Porto Alegre, Brazil World Economic Forum / World Social Forum
March 15, 2002 – Barcelona, Spain EU Summit
April 20, 2002 – Washington, DC (War on Terrorism)
May 1, 2002 – Global, May Day protests
June 14–18; Cities for People protests against U.S. Conference of Mayors
June 24, 2002 – World Bank Oslo 2002 Protests
June 26, 2002 – Calgary, Alberta, and Ottawa, Ontario, G8 summit at Kananaskis, Alberta J26 G8 Protests
September 27, 2002 – Washington, DC, IMF/World Bank
November 4 to 10, 2002 – Florence, Italy, First European Social Forum

2003
May 1, 2003 – Global May Day protests
May 29 – June 3, 2003 – Mass protests in Evian, Geneva, and Lausanne, Switzerland against the G8 summit.
June 26, 2003 – Clashes in Thessalonika Greece, during EU Summit.
July 28, 2003 – Montreal, Quebec
September 14, 2003 – Fifth Ministerial of the WTO in Cancún, Mexico collapses
October 2003 – regional WEF meeting in Dublin, European Competitiveness Summit, cancelled
November 2003 – Paris European Social Forum
November 20, 2003 – large Miami Mobilization against the FTAA; notable for first full implementation of law enforcement 'Miami Model' tactics

2004
April 29, 2004 – Warsaw, Poland, European Economic Forum
May 1, 2004 – Global May Day protests
May 28, 2004 – Guadalajara, Jalisco, Summit of Heads of State and Governments from Latin America, the Caribbean and the European Union
August 29-31, 2004 – Large protests against the 2004 Republican National Convention and Present Bush in New York City
November 19, 2004 – November 23, 2004, Santiago, Chile, Protests against President Bush and the APEC summit. 50,000 protesters denounce the global 'dictatorship of the rich'.

2005
January 20, 2005 – Counter-inaugural protest in Washington, D.C. during the second inauguration of U.S. President George W. Bush.
May 1, 2005 – Global May Day protests
July 2 to 8, 2005 – Mass protests in Edinburgh, Stirling, and Gleneagles, Scotland against the G8 Summit
Dec 13 to 18, 2005 – Protests in Hong Kong, China, World Trade Organization Sixth Ministerial Conference

2006
May 1, 2006 – Global May Day protests
November 18, 2006 to November 19, 2006 – G20 protests in Melbourne, Australia.

2007
March 9, 2007 – Clashes in Sao Paulo, Brazil as protests greet the start of President Bush's six-day tour of Latin America.
March 12, 2007 – Anti-Bush protests in Bogotá, Colombia.
March 14, 2007 – Clashes in Mexico City, the last stop on Bush's Latin America tour.
May 1, 2007 – Global May Day protests
May 29, 2007 – Clashes in Hamburg ahead of the G8 Summit in Heiligendamm.
June 2, 2007 – 80,000 protest in Rostock ahead of the G8 Summit.
September 8, 2007 – APEC Australia 2007
October 18, 2007 – IMF/World Bank annual meeting in Washington, D.C.

2009
March April 28 to 1, 2009 – 2009 G-20 London summit protests
April 1 to 5, 2009 – Anti-NATO protests in Strasbourg (France), Baden-Baden and Kehl (Germany)
April 24 to 26, 2009 – Washington, D.C., World Bank/IMF Meetings
September 23 to 25, 2009 – 2009 G-20 Pittsburgh summit

2010
May 5 to 6, 2010 – May 2010 Greek protests
June 18 to 28, 2010 – 2010 G-20 Toronto summit protests
October 9 to 11, 2010 – Washington, D.C., World Bank/IMF Meetings

2011 

September 17, 2011 – Occupy New York City around 100 protesters gathered in downtown Manhattan walking up and down Wall Street
October 1, 2011 – Occupy New York City protesters set out to march across the Brooklyn Bridge
 October 5, 2011 – Occupy New York City demonstrations swelled to the largest yet with an estimated 15,000 marchers joining the protest.
 October 15, 2011 – The 15 October 2011 global protests
 October 20, 2011 – Occupy British Columbia demonstrations
 October 21, 2011 – Occupy Melbourne protest
 October 22, 2011 – Occupy Antwerp protest
 October 29, 2011 – Occupy Ghent protest
 November 12, 2011 – Occupy Colombia
 November 19, 2011 – Occupy Buffer Zone in Cyprus (also known as #OccupyBufferZ )

2012 

January 2, 2012 – Occupy Nigeria
 February 20, 2012 – Mashtots Park Movement in Armenia
 April 28, 2012 – Occupy Klárov in Prague

2013

2014

2015

2016

2017

2018

2019

References

 
Demonstrations against corporate globalization